The 2007 NCAA Men's Water Polo Championship was the 39th annual NCAA Men's Water Polo Championship to determine the national champion of NCAA men's collegiate water polo. Tournament matches were played at the Avery Aquatic Center in Stanford, California from December 1–2, 2007.

California defeated USC in the final, 8–6, to win their thirteenth national title. The Golden Bears (28–4) were coached by Kirk Everist.

The Most Outstanding Player of the tournament was Michael Sharf from California. Additionally, two All-Tournament Teams were named: a First Team (with seven players, including Sharf) and a Second Team (also with seven players).

The tournament's leading scorer, with 4 goals, was Tim Hummel from Loyola Marymount.

Qualification
Since there has only ever been one single national championship for water polo, all NCAA men's water polo programs (whether from Division I, Division II, or Division III) were eligible. A total of 4 teams were invited to contest this championship.

Bracket
Site: Avery Aquatic Center, Stanford, California

All-tournament teams

First Team 
Michael Sharf, California (Most outstanding player)
Tommy Corcoran, USC
J.W. Krumpholz, USC
Zac Monsees, California
Matt Sagehorn, USC
Mark Sheredy, California
Jeff Tyrrell, California

Second Team 
Shea Buckner, USC
Tim Hummel, Loyola Marymount
Mike Mulvey, Navy
Aaron Recko, Navy
Gabor Sarusi, USC
Adam Shilling, USC
Spencer Warden, California

See also 
 NCAA Men's Water Polo Championship
 NCAA Women's Water Polo Championship

References

NCAA Men's Water Polo Championship
NCAA Men's Water Polo Championship
2007 in sports in California
December 2007 sports events in the United States
2007